Johann Baisamy (born 18 May 1989) is a French snowboarder. He has competed at the 2014 Winter Olympics in Sochi.

References

1989 births
Snowboarders at the 2014 Winter Olympics
Living people
Olympic snowboarders of France
French male snowboarders
Université Savoie-Mont Blanc alumni
21st-century French people